Wang Yin (1911–1988) is a former Chinese actor and director from Hong Kong. Wang won the Golden Horse Award for Best Leading Actor twice, in 1962 and 1971.

Early life 
On June 25, 1911, Wang was born as Wang Chunyuan in Shanghai, China. Wang's ancestral home was in Tianjin.

Career 
Wang began his acting career with Jinan Film Company, appearing in his first film as an actor in 1929. In 1931, Wang became a director and directed his first film. From 1932 to 1940, Wang worked for several film studios, among them Yihua, Lianhua, Mingxing, and Xinhua. During the Japanese occupation of Shanghai, he continued acting in what became known as Solitary Island. In 1947, Wang founded Liangyou Film Company in Hong Kong. He joined the Shaw Brothers Studio in 1950, and worked there for ten years. He remained active until the late 1970s.

Filmography

Films 
This is a partial list of films.
 1932 The Stone - also as Director
 1939 Desperado - also as Writer and Director
 1940 The Love of a Woman ( - also as Director
 1969 Steal Emperor's Crown - Director

Personal life 
On April 13, 1947, Wang moved to Hong Kong. Wang's wife was Yuen Mei-Wan. In 1988, Wang died.

References

External links

1911 births
1988 deaths
Chinese film directors
Chinese male film actors
Male actors from Shanghai
20th-century Chinese male actors
20th-century Hong Kong male actors
Hong Kong male film actors
Hong Kong film directors

Chinese emigrants to Hong Kong